David Drake (born June 27, 1963) is an American playwright, stage director, actor and author.  He is best known as the author and original performer of The Night Larry Kramer Kissed Me, for which he received a Village Voice Obie Award, a 1994 Drama-Logue Award for "Outstanding Solo Performance," and a Robbie Stevens Frontiers Magazine Award for the same. Nominations include a 1994 LA Weekly Theater Award and a Lambda Literary Award nomination for "Best New Play of 1994" (published by Anchor Books).

Biography
Born as David Drakula in Edgewood, Maryland, and raised in Baltimore, he later began going by the name David Drake. He has Romanian roots. Drake has contributed articles to the Advocate, TheaterWeek, and Details.  One of the longest one-actor plays in Off Broadway history, Larry Kramer has received over thirty productions in nearly a dozen countries, and the published version was nominated for a Lambda Literary Award.

In 2000 Drake starred in a movie version of The Night Larry Kramer Kissed Me. The movie was directed by Tim Kirkman and was filmed at Baltimore Theatre Project.

David Drake has appeared in the feature film Philadelphia and on the stage in Vampire Lesbians of Sodom, Pageant, The Boys in the Band, and A Language of Their Own.

He now lives in Provincetown, MA, where he is artistic director of The Provincetown Theater.

Credits

Print
The Night Larry Kramer Kissed Me, New York : Anchor Books, 1994, 112 pages,

Stage
Pageant
Vampire Lesbians of Sodom
The Night Larry Kramer Kissed Me, Summer 1992 
Son of Drakula

As a director, David has directed Eric Bernat's Starstruck, That Woman: Rebecca West Remember, starring Anne Bobby, and The Be(a)st of Taylor Mac, written and performed by Taylor Mac, which won a Herald Angel Award, A Latest Award, and an Argus Angel Award.  In May 2009, his production of James Edwin Parker's 2 Boys in a Bed on a Cold Winter's Night played to sold-out houses and rave reviews as part of the Dublin Gay Theatre Festival.  He is currently working on directing Songs My Mother Never Taught Me, written and performed by Deborah Karpel, which premiered at the Ruhrfestspiele in Recklinghausen, Germany, in June 2009.

In July 2009 he participated in the Sundance Institute Theatre Lab, workshopping Taylor Mac's five-act musical Lily's Revenge.  This was his second trip to Sundance, having directed the workshop of Edmund White's Terre Haute in 2005.

He is a frequent collaborator of New York producer Paul Lucas, for whom he has directed that Woman, The Be(a)st of Taylor Mac, Stand Up/Lie Down, and Songs My Mother Never Taught Me.

He is currently the artistic director of the Provincetown Theater.

Film

See also
Charles Busch

References

External links
 
 Interview

1963 births
Living people
20th-century American dramatists and playwrights
American theatre directors
American gay writers
American gay actors
American LGBT screenwriters
Male actors from Baltimore
People from Edgewood, Maryland
American LGBT dramatists and playwrights
American male dramatists and playwrights
American people of Romanian descent
20th-century American male writers
21st-century LGBT people